Trupanea repleta is a species of tephritid or fruit flies in the genus Trupanea of the family Tephritidae.

Distribution
Cape Verde, Egypt, Eritrea.

References

Tephritinae
Insects described in 1918
Taxa named by Mario Bezzi
Diptera of Africa